Cornelis Hermanus Antonius "Kees" Koster (13 July 1943 – 21 March 2013) was a Dutch computer scientist who was a professor in the Department of Informatics at the Radboud University Nijmegen in the Netherlands.

Born in Haarlem, his family moved to Jakarta after the war. At the age of 11 he returned to the Netherlands on his own. After his study at the University of Amsterdam he worked at the Mathematisch Centrum (MC) in Amsterdam under Adriaan van Wijngaarden.

There he was one of the editors of the original Report on the Algorithmic Language ALGOL 68, being responsible for the design of ALGOL 68's transput.

He became involved with developing international standards in programming and informatics, as a member of the International Federation for Information Processing (IFIP) IFIP Working Group 2.1 on Algorithmic Languages and Calculi, which specified, maintains, and supports the programming languages ALGOL 60 and 68.

He is the creator of the original Compiler Description Language (CDL), and of affix grammars, which are a variant of Van Wijngaarden grammars. In a sense, CDL is a deterministic executable affix grammar, while Prolog is a non-deterministic executable affix grammar; a link acknowledged by the implementors of the original Prolog interpreter.

In 1972, he moved to Berlin to initiate an informatics course at the Technical University of Berlin. In 1977, he became the first Professor of Informatics at the Radboud University Nijmegen. In 2013, he died in a motorcycle accident.

References

External links
 Cornelis H.A. Koster research interests

1943 births
2013 deaths
Dutch computer scientists
Academic staff of Radboud University Nijmegen
Academic staff of the Technical University of Berlin
University of Amsterdam alumni
Scientists from Haarlem
Motorcycle road incident deaths